Nuestra Belleza Puerto Rico Inc. is a beauty pageant and organization that selects the Puerto Rican's official representative to the Miss International, Miss Supranational, Miss Grand International, and Miss Charm pageants.

History
In the early days after acquiring the franchise, most of the country's representatives at Miss Grand International were appointed. Later in 2019, the national pageant of Nuestra Belleza Puerto Rico was created to select the country's representatives for Miss Grand International, Miss International, Miss Supranational, Top Model of the World, and Miss Intercontinental. However, the pageant was canceled in 2020 and 2021 due to the COVID-19 pandemic, and the representatives for the aforementioned international contests were instead determined through the casting process.

In 2022, Nuestra Belleza Puerto Rico, Inc. only holds the Puerto Rican license for Miss Grand International, Miss International, and Miss Supranational.

In 2023, Miss Charm Puerto Rico appointed from Nuestra Belleza Puerto Rico Inc.

Titleholders
This is a list of Puerto Rican women who have represent Puerto Rico at the beauty pageants under Nuestra Balleza Puerto Rico Inc. since 2016.

Miss Grand Puerto Rico

Miss International Puerto Rico

Miss Supranational Puerto Rico

Miss Charm Puerto Rico

References

Beauty pageants in Puerto Rico
Recurring events established in 2016
2016 establishments in Puerto Rico